The Kângë Kreshnikësh ("Songs of Heroes") are the traditional songs of the heroic non-historical cycle of Albanian epic poetry (Albanian: Cikli i Kreshnikëve or Eposi i Kreshnikëve). They are the product of Albanian culture and folklore orally transmitted down the generations by the Albanian rhapsodes (lahutarë) who perform them singing to the accompaniment of the lahutë (some singers use alternatively the çifteli). The Albanian traditional singing of epic verse from memory is one of the last survival of its kind in modern Europe. The poems of the cycle belong to the heroic genre, reflecting the legends that portray and glorify the heroic deeds of the warriors of indefinable old times. The epic poetry about past warriors is an Indo-European tradition shared with South Slavs, but also with other heroic cultures such as those of early Greece, classical India, early medieval England and medieval Germany.

The songs were first time collected in written form in the first decades of the 20th centuries by the Franciscan priests Shtjefën Gjeçovi, Bernardin Palaj and Donat Kurti. Palaj and Kurti were eventually the first to publish a collection of the cycle in 1937, consisting of 34 epic songs containing 8,199 verses in Albanian. Important research was carried out by foreign scholars like Maximilian Lambertz, Fulvio Cordignano, and especially in the 1930s by Milman Parry and Albert Lord, two influential Homeric scholars from Harvard University. Lord's remarkable collection of over 100 songs containing about 25,000 verses is now preserved in the Milman Parry Collection at Harvard University. A considerable amount of work has been done in the last decades. Led for many years by Anton Çeta and Qemal Haxhihasani, Albanologists published multiple volumes on epic, with research carried out by scholars like Rrustem Berisha, Anton Nikë Berisha, and Zymer Ujkan Neziri.

Until the beginning of the 21st century, there have been collected about half a million verses of the cycle (a number that also includes variations of the songs). 23 songs containing 6,165 verses from the collection of Palaj and Kurti were translated into English by Robert Elsie and Janice Mathie-Heck, who in 2004 published them in the book Songs of the Frontier Warriors (Këngë Kreshnikësh). In 2021 Nicola Scaldaferri and his collaborators Victor Friedman, John Kolsti and Zymer U. Neziri published Wild Songs, Sweet Songs: The Albanian Epic in the Collections of Milman Parry and Albert B. Lord. Providing a complete catalogue of Albanian texts and recordings collected by Parry and Lord with a selection of twelve of the most remarkable songs in Albanian including the English translations, the book represents an authoritative guide to one of the most important collections of Balkan folk epic in existence.

Overview

The Albanian epic songs evolved incorporating legendary Balkan motifs form times predating the arrival of the Slavs to about the 17th and 18th centuries, when the songs crystallized to the current form. The names of the Albanian heroes date mainly from the Ottoman period, but the matrix of the epic songs is much older. In particular, peculiar traits of the two brothers and main characters of the epic cycle, Muji and Halili, are considered to be analogous to those of the Ancient Greek Dioscuri and their equivalents among the early Germans, Celts, Armenians, Indians, and other ancient peoples, who trace back to the common Proto-Indo-European Divine twins.

The main theme of the cycle is the brave warfare between the Albanian heroes (Albanian: kreshnikë or trima, and aga), who have supernatural strength and an extremely large body holding ordinary family lives, and opposing Slavic warriors (Albanian: shkje and krajla), who are likewise powerful and brave, but without besë. The songs are the product of a mountain tribal society in which blood kinship (Albanian: fis) is the foundation, and the Kanun, a code of Albanian oral customary laws, direct all the aspects of the social organization. In the songs emerges a truly heroic concept of life. The hero is admired, and heroism transcends enmity, so the characters are ready to recognise the valor of their opponents. The disputes between heroes are generally solved by duels, in which characters take part sometimes in order to show who is the greater warrior, but mainly in order to defend their honor or that of their kins (Albanian culture considers honor as the highest ideal of the society, thus heroes uphold honor disdaining life without it). The duels are sometimes engaged on horseback, other times hand-to-hand (Albanian: fytafyt, fytas), and the weapons often used are medieval, like swords (shpata), clubs (topuza), spears (shtiza).

Nature has a strong hold in the songs, so much that its components are animated, so the moon, sun, stars, clouds, earth and mountains participate in the world of humans influencing their events. People also address oaths or long curses to the animated elements of nature. In battles, the heroes can be assisted by the zana and ora, supernatural female mythological figures. The zana and ora symbolize the vital energy and existential time of human beings respectively. The zana idealizes feminine energy, wild beauty, eternal youth and the joy of nature. They appear as warlike nymphs capable of offering simple mortals a part of their own psychophysical and divine power, giving humans strength comparable to that of the drangue. The ora represent the "moment of the day" (Albanian: koha e ditës) and the flowing of human destiny. As masters of time and place, they take care of humans (also of the zana and of some particular animals) watching over their life, their house and their hidden treasures before sealing their destiny.

Almost all the epic songs begin with the ritual praise to the supreme being: "Lum për ty o i lumi Zot!" ("Praise be to you, o praised God!"). The primeval religiosity of the Albanian mountains and epic poetry is reflected by a supreme deity who is the god of the universe, but who is the conceival of the belief in the fantastic and supernatural beings and things, allowing the existence of zanas and oras for the dreams and comfort of humans. The goddesses of fate "maintain the order of the universe and enforce its laws" – "organising the appearance of humankind." However great his power, the supreme god holds an executive role as he only carries out what has been already ordained by the fate goddesses.

Legendary creatures of the Albanian epic songs belong to the repertoire of the general Mediterranean mythology. Among the main legendary animals are horses, snakes and birds, which are able to speak like humans. The horse holds swimming abilities, similar to the hippocampus of the god Poseidon in Ancient Greek mythology. This mythical figure appears not only in oral tradition, but also in monochrome mosaics like those found in Durrës. Along with speaking and swimming attributes, the horse appears in the epic songs as a mourning character, an animal which humanly expresses its emotions and sufferings. An analogy is found in the Homeric myth, where Peleus' horses, Balius and Xanthus, mourn humans when they pass away. Muji's horse also manifests oracular abilities, being able to predict the future. The bird, typically a speaking cuckoo, is similar in qualities to the owl of the Ancient Greek goddess Athena and Roman Minerva, which tells the truth and which can be entrusted. The cuckoo often appears in Albanian epics as a messenger bird which confers information. The speaking snake holds singing, healing, advising and divining abilities. In the epic songs the snake assists the hero, and the humans protect it and honor it as a totem. In some songs the snake appears as a witness of the truth. Another mythical creature is the wild goat. Three golden horned goats appear in the Albanian epic as deities of the forest, which ensure the zanas their supernatural abilities. The divine power of the goats resides in their golden horns.

Documentation

Franciscan priest Shtjefën Gjeçovi, who was the first one to collect the Albanian Kanun in writing, also began to collect the Frontier Warrior Songs and write them down. From 1919 onward, Gjeçovi's work was continued by Franciscans Bernandin Palaj and Donat Kurti. They would travel on foot to meet with the bards and write down their songs. Kângë Kreshnikësh dhe Legenda (Songs of Heroes and Legends) appeared thus as a first publication in 1937 including 34 epic songs with 8,199 verses in Albanian after Gjeçovi's death and were included within the Visaret e Kombit book. Other important research was carried out by foreign scholars like Maximilian Lambertz and Fulvio Cordignano.

At this time, parallel to the interest shown in Albania in the collection of the songs, scholars of epic poetry became interested in the illiterate bards of the Sanjak and Bosnia. This had aroused the interest of Milman Parry, a Homeric scholar from Harvard University, and his then assistant, Albert Lord. Parry and Lord stayed in Bosnia for a year (1934–1935) and recorded over 100 Albanian epic songs containing about 25,000 verses. Out of the five bards they recorded, four were Albanians: Salih Ugljanin, Djemal Zogic, Sulejman Makic, and Alija Fjuljanin. These singers were from Novi Pazar and the Sanjak, and were able to reproduce the same songs in both Albanian and Serbo-Croatian. In 1937, shortly after the death of Parry, Lord went to Albania, began learning Albanian, and travelled throughout Albania collecting Albanian heroic verses, which are now preserved in the Milman Parry Collection at Harvard University.

Research in the field of Albanian literature resumed in Albania during the 1950s with the founding of the Albanian Institute of Science, forerunner of the Academy of Sciences of Albania. The establishment of the Folklore Institute of Tirana in 1961 was of particular importance to the continued research and publication of folklore at a particularly satisfactory scholarly level. In addition, the foundation of the Albanological Institute in Pristina added a considerable number of works on the Albanian epic. A considerable amount of work has been done in the last decades. Led for many years by Anton Çeta and Qemal Haxhihasani, Albanologists published multiple volumes on epic, with research carried out by scholars like Rrustem Berisha, Anton Nikë Berisha, and Zymer Ujkan Neziri. Until the beginning of the 21st century, there have been collected about half a million verses of the cycle (a number that also includes variations of the songs). 23 songs containing 6,165 verses from the collection of Palaj and Kurti were translated into English by Robert Elsie and Janice Mathie-Heck, who in 2004 published them in the book Songs of the Frontier Warriors (Këngë Kreshnikësh).

The songs, linked together, form a long epic poem, similar to the Finnish Kalevala, compiled and published in 1835 by Elias Lönnrot as gathered from Finnish and Karelian folklore.

Synopsis

The source of Muji's strength

As young, Muji was sent by his father to work at the service of a rich man to gain his living becoming a cowherd. Every day Muji brought his herd of cows up to the mountain pastures, where he used to leave the animals graze, while he ate bread and salt, drank water from the springs and rested in the warm afternoon. The cows were producing much milk, however Muji received still only bread and salt as wages. Things went well until one day Muji lost his cows in the mountains. He looked for them unsuccessfully until night, thus he decided to get some sleep and wait until dawn, but he immediately noticed two cradles with crying infants near the boulder where he was resting. He went over and began rocking the cradles to comfort the infants until they fell asleep. At midnight, two lights appeared on the top of the boulder and Muji heard two female voices asking him why he was there, so he informed them of his desperate situation. Since he couldn't see them in face, Muji asked about their identity and the nature of the dazzling lights. The two bright figures recognized Muji because they had often seen him in the pastures with his cows, thus they revealed to him that they were zanas. Subsequently, they granted Muji a wish for having taken care for the infants, offering him a choice between strength to be a mighty warrior, property and wealth, or knowledge and ability to speak other languages. Muji wished for strength to fight and beat the other cowherds who tease him. The zanas thus gave him their breasts. Muji drank three drops of milk and immediately felt strong enough to uproot a tree out of the ground. To test Muji's strength, the zanas asked him to lift the enormous heavy boulder that was near them, but he raised it only as high as his ankles. So the zanas gave him their breasts again and Muji drank until he was strong enough to raise the boulder over his head, becoming powerful like a Drangue. The zanas later proposed to him to become their blood brother, and Muji accepted. Afterwards the zanas took their cradles and disappeared; Muji instead woke up at daylight and departed in search of his cows. He found them and went back down into the Plain of Jutbina, where all the cowherds had already assembled. When they saw Muji coming, they began making fun of him, but this time he  beat them. Muji abandoned the charge of his master and returned to his home. He started working for himself and went hunting up in the mountains. In later times Muji waged many battles and became a victorious hero.

Main Characters

Muji and Halili cycle 
Mother of Muji and Halili
Muji and Halili
Omer
Ajkuna

Gjergj Elez Alia legend 
Gjergj Elez Alia
Sister of Gjergj Elez Alia
Baloz

Songs of Palaj–Kurti's collection

Gjeto Basho MujiMartesa
Orët e Mujit
Muji te Mbreti
Martesa e Halilit
Gjergj Elez Alija
Muji e BehuriDeka e Dizdar Osman agës me Zukun bajraktar
Fuqija e Mujit
Fuqija e Halilit
Gjogu i MujitHargelja
Omeri i rí
Zuku Bajraktár
Bejlegu ndërmjet dy vllazënve të panjoftunArnaut Osmani e Hyso Radoica
Ali BajraktariB E S A
Martesa e Ali Bajraktarit
Bani Zadrili
Arnaut Osmani
Ali Aga i rí
Zuku mer Rushën
Basho Jona
Martesa e Plakut Qefanak
Rrëmbimi i së shoqes së Mujit
Muji e Jevrenija
Halili merr gjakun e Mujit
Siran Aga
Halili i qet bejleg Mujit
Omeri prej Mujit
Deka e Hasapit
Muji i rrethuem në kullë
Deka e Omerit
Ajkuna kján Omerin
Deka e Halilit
Muji i varruem
Muji mbas deket
Halili mbas deket

Songs of Elsie–Mathie-Heck's translation

Mujo's Strength (n. 7 of Palaj-Kurti's coll.)
Marriage of Mujo (n. 1 of Palaj-Kurti's coll.)
Mujo's Oras (n. 2 of Palaj-Kurti's coll.)
Mujo Visits the Sultan (n. 3 of Palaj-Kurti's coll.)
Marriage of Halili (n. 4 of Palaj-Kurti's coll.)
Gjergj Elez Alia (n. 5 of Palaj-Kurti's coll.)
Mujo and Behuri (n. 6 of Palaj-Kurti's coll.)
Mujo's Courser (n. 9 of Palaj-Kurti's coll.)
Young Omeri (n. 10 of Palaj-Kurti's coll.)
Zuku Bajraktar (n. 11 of Palaj-Kurti's coll.)
Osmani and Radoica (n. 12 of Palaj-Kurti's coll.)
Ali Bajraktari (n. 13 of Palaj-Kurti's coll.)
Arnaut Osmani (n. 16 of Palaj-Kurti's coll.)
Zuku Captures Rusha (n. 18 of Palaj-Kurti's coll.)
Mujo's Wife Kidnapped (n. 21 of Palaj-Kurti's coll.)
Mujo and Jevrenija (n. 22 of Palaj-Kurti's coll.)
Halili Avenges Mujo (n. 23 of Palaj-Kurti's coll.)
Omer, Son of Mujo (n. 26 of Palaj-Kurti's coll.)
Death of Omer (n. 29 of Palaj-Kurti's coll.)
Ajkuna Mourns Omer (n. 30 of Palaj-Kurti's coll.)
Death of Halili (n. 31 of Palaj-Kurti's coll.)
Mujo Wounded (n. 32 of Palaj-Kurti's coll.)
After Mujo's Death (n. 33 of Palaj-Kurti's coll.)

See also 
The Twins (Albanian tale)

Footnotes

Sources

Citations

Bibliography

.

Further reading

External links
Songs of the Frontier Warriors (English translation by Elsie)
"The Lord Albanian Collection, 1937" in the "Milman Parry Collection of Oral Literature", Harvard University Libraries
International Society for Epic Studies
Mirash Ndou, Albanian singer of tales
"Marriage of Halili" by the lahutar Isë Elezi-Lekëgjekaj

Albanian folklore
Albanian mythology
Epic poetry